Breuk Iversen (born July 25, 1964) is a designer and writer.  Iversen was nicknamed the Mayor of Williamsburg, Brooklyn, one of the liveliest and largest art communities in the world.  He is famous for his production, with Jan McLaughlin, at the Dam Stuhltrager Gallery of the "Salon des Refuses": the Offal Project, a site-specific exhibit that explored issues of economy, aesthetics, politics and popular culture through society's by-products.

Biography

Breuk Iversen was born in the Sunset Park area of Brooklyn, New York and the first of two children born of Frank Iversen, an amateur botanist and craftsman, and wife, Joanne Iversen.  He has worked as a publicist, graphic designer, copywriter, and social media specialist.  Other noteworthy interests; advertising, branding, communications, Chinese culture, Feng Shui, Taoism, Tetrad Management developed by Marshall McLuhan, Music Composition & Fine Art.

In 1999, he graduated from School of Visual Arts (SVA) where he studied under Len Sirowitz, Dick Raboy, James Victore, Tony Palladino, Steven Brower, and Milton Glaser.  In his second year at SVA, he opened a design firm, on 5th Avenue in NYC named Disciplined Beauty and by graduation, had owned and operated the design firm, where he worked under the reputed title of Creative Director.  On 5th Avenue (1996–2001), his office was directly across the hall from Dick Raboy, a NYC advertising copywriter, and Mr Iversen had studied under Dick's tutelage until his passing in May 2004.

11211 Magazine

Iversen published several magazines, including 11211 Magazine. Iversen launched the four color glossy in Brooklyn and Manhattan, New York City, intent on promoting the 11211 ZIP code of Williamsburg, Brooklyn. Notable other magazines were Fortnight, The Box Map (2002), Appetite, and 10003 Magazine for the East Village in Manhattan. 11211 Magazine had attracted worldwide attention editorializing infamous artists such as Terrance Lindall, Rene Iatba, Nick Zedd, Boaz Vaadia and Mike Diana .

In September 2000, Iversen published 11211 Magazine from his Manhattan-based design firm; a year later, the firm moved to Williamsburg and began to focus on the historical and notable properties and landmarks, arts and culture, culinary, and real estate development of that neighborhood. Total circulation attributed to 11211 Magazine for promoting the Williamsburg area was 72 issues (548,000 copies) over a six-year period from 2000–06. The efficiency of this undertaking and its effects on gentrification of the area are speculative and sourced in a 2001 article in The New York Times and summarized on the BinkNyc website.

Offal Movement
Iversen is the founding member of the art collaborative known as "Offalists", using common refuse as a medium.  Among several exhibits under the Offal Project included refuse collected from galleries operating under the Williamsburg Gallery Association and advertised with the motto: "See all the Williamsburg Gallery Association's garbage in one place".  "Salon des Refuses" became the talk of Williamsburg.

As part of the opening night's performances, one thousand dollars was on sale for less than half price. $1 bills sold for $0.49, $5 bills for $2.49, $10. bills for $4.99, and finally $20 bills for $9.99 each.  Terrance Lindall of the Williamsburg Art and Historical Center said, "It shows that artists can provide a useful service to society by collecting garbage", in part jest.

Regarding Offalism, Breuk said: "Senior year, at SVA, I devised a fine art project with some fellow students: W. Timothy Ryan (painter), Dmitry Gubin (photographer), and a prolific Williamsburg poet, Kay Divant.  Kay suggested I move to Williamsburg with my now former wife, Debora Gutman, to join the developing artist colony." 

"The Offal Project was an antecedent, four-person collaborative project based on garbage (literally) permanently trapped under resin. Arbitrary addresses in Manhattan were photographed and I transported garbage by train or taxi back to Williamsburg for cementing. This satisfied my appetite for studying both Sociology and random synchronistic events. Offalism conceptually merged Surrealism, Pop Art, Dadaism, Postmodernism and Abstract Expressionism.  We created 'time capsules' indicative of our present day culture which coupled as an excellent platform for sociological information extrapolation. We had four artists instead of one, a designer, painter, photographer and writer (similar components used in magazine publishing) and neither would dictate what the other should do."

"The Offal inquiry suggested that our society is overtly operating under a super-technologically enforced binary system which manifests lethargic responses using multiplicity in contradiction to our natural genealogy as human beings. This ontological discourse directly influenced my decision to introduce a magazine with a "no editing" policy. An absurd and socially disruptive notion. We attempted paralleling strict, mathematically charged Pythagorean archetypes (space) vis•a•vis arbitrary events (time), seeking paradigms in the Zeitgeist."''''

References

External links
 Rene Iatba’s official website

1964 births
21st-century American writers
American designers
American male writers
Living people
Writers from Brooklyn
People from Sunset Park, Brooklyn